Hedge Thompson (January 28, 1780 - July 23, 1828), a Representative from New Jersey.  Thompson was born in Salem, New Jersey on January 28, 1780.  He graduated from the medical department of the University of Pennsylvania at Philadelphia in 1802 and practiced his profession in Salem; member of the New Jersey General Assembly in 1805; served in the New Jersey Legislative Council (now the New Jersey Senate) in 1819; appointed associate judge of Salem County, N.J., in 1815 and again in 1824; served as collector for Salem County from 1826 to 1828; elected to the Twentieth Congress and served from March 4, 1827, until his death in Salem, N.J., on July 23, 1828; interment in St. John's Protestant Episcopal Churchyard.

Information found on public domain website of the Bioguide of the US Congress.

See also
List of United States Congress members who died in office (1790–1899)

External links

Hedge Thompson at The Political Graveyard

1780 births
1828 deaths
Members of the New Jersey General Assembly
Members of the New Jersey Legislative Council
People from Salem, New Jersey
Politicians from Salem County, New Jersey
National Republican Party members of the United States House of Representatives from New Jersey
Perelman School of Medicine at the University of Pennsylvania alumni
Burials at St. John's Episcopal Cemetery, Salem, New Jersey
19th-century American politicians